The 2019 Tour of Norway was a road cycling stage race that took place in Norway between 28 May 2019 and 2 June 2019. It was the ninth edition of the Tour of Norway and was rated as a 2.HC event as part of the 2019 UCI Europe Tour.

Teams
21 teams participated in the race, including 11 UCI WorldTeams, 7 UCI Professional Continental teams, and 3 UCI Continental teams. Each team had a maximum of six riders:

UCI WorldTeams

 
 
 
 
 
 
 
 
 
 
 

UCI Professional Continental Teams

 
 
 
 
 
 
 

UCI Continental Teams

 Joker Fuel of Norway

Route

Stages

Stage 1
28 May 2019 — Stavanger to Egersund,

Stage 2
29 May 2019 — Kvinesdal to Mandal,

Stage 3
30 May 2019 — Lyngdal to Kristiansand,

Stage 4
31 May 2019 — Arendal to Sandefjord,

Stage 5
1 June 2019 — Skien to Drammen,

Stage 6
2 June 2019 — Gran to Hønefoss,

Classification leadership

Final standings

General classification

Points classification

Mountains classification

Young rider classification

Teams classification

References

External links

2019 UCI Europe Tour
2019 in Norwegian sport
2019
May 2019 sports events in Europe
June 2019 sports events in Europe